The following is a summary of Dublin county football team's 2008 season.

O'Byrne Cup
2008 O'Byrne Cup

National Football League

2008 National Football League results

Leinster Senior Football Championship

All-Ireland Senior Football Championship
All-Ireland Senior Football Championship 2008

See also
 2008 Dublin county hurling team season

References

Season Dublin
Dublin county football team seasons